The Couzinet 33 Biarritz was a French long-range monoplane built by René Couzinet in the early 1930s.

Design
The wing main-spar was  continuous from wing-tip to wing-tip; and the rear spars attached to the fuselage sides. The aircraft was covered with birch plywood, with the fuselage thinning to the rear, forming the characteristic tail of a René Couzinet signature aircraft.

Couzinet designed the plane when he was 27 years old with only 28 flight hours.

Operational history
The biarritz made its first flight in November 1931, clocking up 27 hours flying before departing on a flight from Paris to Nouméa. From 6 March 1932 to 5 April 1932 Emile Munch, Max Dévé and Charles Verneilh flew the Biarritz from France to New Caledonia, the first time a direct flight had succeeded. On arrival at Nouméa the aircraft crashed and was destroyed.

Biarritz No.2
After the wreckage of the Biarritz was shipped back to France, a second aircraft was built using salvageable parts of the first. This aircraft set off on a non-stop flight from Paris to Algiers on 30 October 1933, flown by Charles Verneilh, but crashed in fog at Blaisy-Bas in the Côte-d'Or.

Specifications

References

Further reading

1930s French airliners
Trimotors
Low-wing aircraft
33
Aircraft first flown in 1931